The Very Best of Elvis Costello and The Attractions 1977–86 is a 1994 compilation album by Elvis Costello and The Attractions.

Track listing
All songs written by Elvis Costello except as noted.
 "Alison" (from My Aim Is True, 1977) – 3:21
 "Watching the Detectives" (from single, 1978) – 3:45
 "(I Don't Want to Go to) Chelsea" (from This Year's Model, 1978) – 3:07
 "Pump It Up" (from This Year's Model, 1978) – 3:14
 "Radio Radio" (from single, 1978) – 3:05
 "(What's So Funny 'Bout) Peace, Love and Understanding" (Nick Lowe) (from single, 1979) – 3:31
 "Oliver's Army" (from Armed Forces, 1979) – 2:58
 "Accidents Will Happen" (from Armed Forces, 1979) – 3:00
 "I Can't Stand Up For Falling Down" (Homer Banks, Allen Jones) (from Get Happy!!, 1980) – 2:05
 "New Amsterdam" (from Get Happy!!, 1980) – 2:11
 "High Fidelity" (from Get Happy!!, 1980) – 2:26
 "Clubland" (from Trust, 1981) – 3:42
 "Watch Your Step" (from Trust, 1981) – 2:57
 "Good Year for the Roses" (Jerry Chesnut) (from Almost Blue, 1981) – 3:07
 "Beyond Belief" (from Imperial Bedroom, 1982) – 2:33
 "Man Out of Time" (from Imperial Bedroom, 1982) – 5:26
 "Everyday I Write the Book" (from Punch the Clock, 1983) – 3:53
 "Shipbuilding" (Costello and Clive Langer) (from Punch the Clock, 1983) – 4:51
 "Love Field" (from Goodbye Cruel World, 1984) – 3:26
 "Brilliant Mistake" (from King of America, 1986) – 3:42
 "Indoor Fireworks" (from King of America, 1986) – 4:07
 "I Want You" (from Blood and Chocolate, 1986) – 6:40

References

1994 greatest hits albums
Albums produced by Elvis Costello
Albums produced by Nick Lowe
Albums produced by T Bone Burnett
Elvis Costello compilation albums
Rykodisc compilation albums
Albums produced by Geoff Emerick